Stella Sampras-Webster (born March 9, 1969) is an American former professional tennis player.

Biography
Born in Potomac, Maryland to Greek-American parents, Sampras is one of four siblings. Her younger brother is tennis player Pete Sampras. She grew up in Los Angeles and played college tennis for the UCLA Bruins from 1987 to 1991, earning All-American honors on four occasions. In her freshman year she teamed up with Allison Cooper to win the NCAA doubles championship.

Sampras competed briefly on the professional tour, reaching a career best singles ranking of 248, with two ITF titles to her name. As a doubles player she twice appeared in the main draw of the US Open and was ranked as high as 142 in the world.

Since 1996, she has been the head coach of UCLA women's tennis.

Sampras is married to marketing executive Steve Webster, with whom she has twin daughters, born in 2005.

ITF Circuit finals

Singles: 2 (2 titles)

Doubles: 1 (1 title, 1 runner-up)

References

External links
 
 

1969 births
Living people
American female tennis players
UCLA Bruins women's tennis players
UCLA Bruins coaches
American tennis coaches
American people of Greek descent
American people of Greek-Jewish descent
American people of Polish-Jewish descent
Tennis people from California
People from Potomac, Maryland
College tennis coaches in the United States